Stian Remme (born 4 June 1982) is a Norwegian former professional racing cyclist.

Major results

2005
 1st  Team time trial, National Road Championships (with Are Andresen Hunsager and Morten Christiansen)
2006
 1st  Team time trial, National Road Championships (with Morten Hegreberg and Kjetil Ingvaldsen)
 1st Stage 2 Fana Sykkelfestival
2007
 1st Overall Grenland GP
1st Stage 3
 2nd Ronde de l'Oise
2008
 2nd Road race, National Road Championships
 3rd Overall Tour des Pyrénées
1st Stage 2
2009
 1st Overall Fana Sykkelfestival
1st Stages 1 & 2
 1st Stage 5 Ringerike GP
2011
 2nd Tour Alsace
 2nd Mi-août en Bretagne
2013
 3rd Hadeland GP

References

External links

1982 births
Living people
Norwegian male cyclists
Sportspeople from Bergen